Amanda A. Reeve is an American politician. She was a member of the Arizona House of Representatives representing District 6, serving from 2010 to 2013. Reeve is a member of the Republican party.

References

Living people
Republican Party members of the Arizona House of Representatives
Politicians from Phoenix, Arizona
Women state legislators in Arizona
21st-century American politicians
21st-century American women politicians
Year of birth missing (living people)